Gongsar Ugyen Wangchuck (11 June 1862 – 26 August 1926) was the first Druk Gyalpo (King) of Bhutan from 1907 to 1926. In his lifetime, he made efforts to unite the fledgling country and gain the trust of the people.

Life

Embattled boyhood and rise to power
Ugyen Wangchuck was born in Wangducholing Palace, Bumthang in 1862. His father, Jigme Namgyal, was the Druk Desi of Bhutan at the time and 
He was apprenticed at the court of his father in the art of leadership and warfare at a very young age. Because he grew up in an embattled period, Ugyen Wangchuck was trained as a skilled combatant. In 1876, when he was 14, Ugyen joined his father in fighting the rebellious Penlop of Paro, Tshewnag Norbu. In early 1877 his father left Ugyen in Paro to deal with a rebellion in Punakha. Ugyen was kidnapped by one of his father's enemies, Damchö Rinchen. When Jigme Namgyal threatened to kill twelve members of Rinchen's sister's family, Rinchen released Ugyen. Soon afterwards, in 1878, Jigme Namgyal appointed Ugyen as the Penlop of Paro at the age of 16. Soon after, in 1881, Jigme died, and Ugyen took on many of his father's responsibilities. He tried to reconcile with the enemies of his father, offering gifts to monasteries that disliked Jigme Namgyal, and showing kindness and forbearance to those that had personally wronged his father.

Afterwards, Ugyen began work to consolidate power and put those he trusted into key positions of government. In 1882, after a period of strife and civil war, Ugyen assumed the position as the Penlop of Trongsa, a post his father had held. Ugyen continued to further suppress dissent. Two of Ugyen's trusted allies, Alu Dorji and Phuntsho Dorji, rebelled against him and attempted to instate a monk of their choosing as the 55th Druk Desi. This culminated in the battle of Changlimethang in 1886, the last armed civil conflict in Bhutanese history. Ugyen, now 24, held a decisive victory, eliminated all internal strife, making him the de facto ruler of Bhutan.

Founding of Buddhist monarchy by unanimous agreement
Bhutan had been ruled under 54 successive Druk Desis for 256 years until Buddhist monarchy was established. Ugyen Wangchuck founded the monarchy in 1907, although he had been more or less the actual ruler for more than a decade. On 17 December 1907, Ugyen Wangchuck was elected unanimously by the representatives of the people, the officials and the clergy and enthroned as the first hereditary King of Bhutan in Punakha Dzong. A legal document on the institution of monarchy was attested with signet-rings and thumbprints, on that day. British political officer, Sir Claude White (1853–1918), represented the British government at the enthronement ceremony. Since that day, 17 December is celebrated as the National Day of Bhutan (Gyalyong Duechen).

Foreign relations and official visits abroad
Ugyen Wangchuck, then 12th Trongsa Penlop, joined the Younghusband Expedition to Tibet in 1904, as a mediator between Britain and Tibet. His next official visit abroad took place in 1906 when he travelled to Kolkata to meet the Prince of Wales.  Penlop Ugyen Wangchuck was not yet formally the King, but the role he took clearly suggests that he was indeed the ruler for all practical purpose for many years before he was crowned King in 1907. King Ugyen Wangchuck's last visit to India took place in 1911, when he went to Delhi to meet King George V (1865–1936), who was the Prince of Wales when they met earlier in 1906 in Kolkata, the seat of Viceroy of India. The British Political Officer for Bhutan was Sir John Claude White until 1908 when he was succeeded by Charles Alfred Bell (1870–1945). John Claude White developed a deep respect for King Ugyen Wangchuck, and wrote: "I have never met a native I liked and respected more than I do Sir Ugyen. He was upright, honest, open and straightforward." White also took the photographs at the King's 1907 coronation.

His Majesty King Ugyen Wangchuck was acutely conscious that Bhutan must to be protected through times of regional conflict and rivalries. His Majesty was exquisitely farsighted in updating the treaty of 1865 in 1910, with an additional clause. The new clause was that Bhutan would consult British India in its dealing with third countries. The clause was drawn up in the context of the British suspicion about the influence of the Chinese and Russians in Tibet, and beyond.

Spirituality
King Ugyen Wangchuck had close relationship with many Buddhist spiritual masters such as Lama Serkong Dorji Chang (1856–1918), Tertön Zilnon Namkha Dorji, and the 15th Karmapa Khachyab Dorji (1871–1922). In 1894, aged 33, he undertook the construction of Kurjey temple, one of the landmarks of Vajrayana Buddhism in the world. The middle lhakhang in Kurjey, with its towering Guru statue, was built in 1894 by King Ugyen Wangchuck.   His Majesty was a great benefactor to the dratshangs (monastic bodies) throughout the country. As part of his vision for scholarship and education of young Bhutanese, he sent two groups of Bhutanese to study up to geshey level in Tibet.  Twice, in 1915 and 1917, he sent batches of young monks to Zhenphen Choki Nangwa (1871–1927) in Dokham. They later returned to Bhutan and became influential geshes (doctorate level) and lamas, serving as radiant sources of Buddhist teachings.  One of the iconic pilgrimage centres of Buddhism is the Swayambhunath Temple in Kathmandu, a monastic enclave held by Bhutan. It was renovated mostly with King Ugyen Wangchuck's personal funds. Kagyu Lama Togden Shacha Shri (1853–1919), with whom King Ugyen Wangchuck corresponded a great deal, supervised the renovation on behalf of King Ugyen Wangchuck.

Western schools
King Ugyen's commitment was not only confined to spreading monastic education. Following his visits to Kolkata and Delhi, he began to establish schools. The first were established in Lame Goenpa and Wangducholing, with 14 Bhutanese boys from both eastern and western Bhutan. Later, the number increased to 46. By then, students were being sent to missionary schools in Kalimpong. Those members of the first batch of students became important officials in the 1930s and 1940s. King Ugyen took the initiative to sow the seeds of western education, as well as strengthen the roots of dharma in Bhutan.

Death
In 1926, aged 64, King Ugyen died at Thinley Rabten Palace in Phodrang.

Honours

Foreign honours
  :
  Knight Grand Commander of the Order of the Indian Empire (GCIE) (01/01/1921) 1921 New Year Honours
  Knight Commander of the Order of the Star of India (KCSI) (12/12/1911)
  Knight Commander of the Order of the Indian Empire (KCIE) (02/01/1905) 1905 New Year Honours
  Recipient of the Delhi Durbar Gold Medal (12/12/1911)

Ancestry

Footnotes

1862 births
1926 deaths
Bhutanese monarchs
Wangchuck dynasty
Knights Commander of the Order of the Star of India
Knights Grand Commander of the Order of the Indian Empire
Buddhist monarchs
People from Bumthang District